Hoseynabad (also Romanized as Ḩoseynābād) is a village in Hana Rural District, Abadeh Tashk District, Neyriz County, Fars Province, Iran. At the 2006 census, its population was 336, in 71 families.

References 

Populated places in Abadeh Tashk County